Neochildia is a monotypic genus of a dark brown acoel belonging to the family Convolutidae. The only species is Neochildia fusca.

The nervous system is composed of an anterior compact brain organized as a layer of neural somata surrounding a central neuropil free of cell bodies.

References

Acoelomorphs